Kavirabad may refer to:
 Kavirabad, Tehran